Dalad Banner (Mongolian:   Далад қосиу Dalad qosiɣu) is a banner of western Inner Mongolia, People's Republic of China, lying on the southern (right) bank of the Yellow River. It is under the administration of Ordos City, although it is closer to the city of Baotou,  to the north-northwest.

Climate

Economy
The local industrial zone Dalad Economic Development Zone is home to chemical plants, aluminum smelters, and one of the world's largest bitcoin mining operations. The operator of the zone's bitcoin mine Bitmain produced in 2017 about 5% of the world's daily production of Bitcoin in a facility with 25,000 computers tended to by about 50 employees.

However, Inner Mongolia plans to ban cryptocurrency mining from April 2021.

References

External links
Official site 

Banners of Inner Mongolia
Ordos City